Cricotopus sylvestris formerly Cricotopus silvestris, is a species of midge in the family Chironomidae. It is found in Asia, Europe, The United Kingdom, and North America.

Ecology
It is believed that the complete development of this species from larvae to adult is temperature dependent. In laboratory conditions, larvae completed development in 10 days at 22° and 29 °C. When temperatures were at 15°, it took 28 days. The production to biomass (P/B) ratio for this species has one of the highest values reported for chironomids.
Midge larvae are often eaten by other invertebrates, such as damselfly naiads/Nymph (biology), and fish. In North America, it is noted that this species is a natural enemy of Berosus ingeminatus and Ischnura verticalis

In the United Kingdom 
In the U.K, this species is considered to be native but with a sporadic range.

References

Further reading

 

Chironomidae
Articles created by Qbugbot
Insects described in 1794